Novopokrovka may refer to:
Novopokrovka, Russia, name of several inhabited localities in Russia
Novopokrovka, Kyrgyzstan, a village in Chüy Region, Kyrgyzstan
Novopokrovka, Ukraine, name of several inhabited localities in Ukraine

See also
Pokrovka (disambiguation)
Pokrov (disambiguation)